Puthiya Kovilakathu Sree Manavedan Raja (22 March 1913 – 27 March 2013) was the titular Zamorin of Calicut from 16 August 2003 to 27 March 2013.

Early life and education 
Manavedan Raja was born on 22 March 1913 to A. K. T. K. M. Ashtamoorthi Namboothiripad and Kunhithambatty Thambooratthy at Thiruvanur near Calicut (present-day Kozhikode). Manavedan Raja had his schooling at the Zamorin's High School, Calicut and graduated in mathematics from Loyola College.

Career 
Manavedan Raja was employed with the Post and Telegraph Department and served as an officer in Chittagong when Japanese Air Force bombarded the city during the Second World War.

Reign 
Manavedan Raja was crowned Zamorin on the death of his predecessor P. K. Ettanunni Raja on 16 August 2003. The post was largely ceremonial as their power had been extinguished in the 18th century. Manavedan Raja was, however, trustee to over 80 Hindu temples and held a permanent seat in the managing committee of the Guruvayur temple.

Death 
Raja died on 27 March 2013, five days after turning 100, and on the eve of his birthday according to Malayalam calendar - Atham (Hasta) star in the month of Meenam. He was cremated with full state honours on the same day at his family crematorium. He is survived by his three daughters. His wife Bharathi predeceased him in 2003.

Notes

References 
 

1913 births
2013 deaths
Indian centenarians
Men centenarians